This article contains information about the literary events and publications of 1971.

Events
March 25–December 14 – The 1971 killing of Bengali intellectuals reaches a peak.
April 21 – The 13th-century Codex Regius manuscript is returned by Denmark to Iceland under naval escort.
July 4 – Michael S. Hart posts the first e-book, a copy of the United States Declaration of Independence, on the University of Illinois at Urbana–Champaign's mainframe computer, as the origin of Project Gutenberg.
July 14 – Simon Gray's play Butley has its first performance at the Criterion Theatre in London, produced by Michael Codron and directed by Harold Pinter, with Alan Bates in the lead.
October 20 – The Destiny Waltz by Gerda Charles wins the U.K.'s first Whitbread Novel of the Year Award. Geoffrey Hill wins the poetry prize for Mercian Hymns and Michael Meyer the biography category for Henrik Ibsen.
November – Hunter S. Thompson's roman à clef Fear and Loathing in Las Vegas: A Savage Journey to the Heart of the American Dream is first published in Rolling Stone, as a two-part article illustrated by Ralph Steadman.
November 29 – Yuri Lyubimov's production of Hamlet is seen first at the Taganka Theatre in Moscow, with singer-songwriter and poet Vladimir Vysotsky in the lead.
December 24 – The Dutch writer and broadcaster Godfried Bomans is buried in the Sint-Adelbertskerkhof (St. Adelbert Cemetery) in Bloemendaal, the Netherlands, two days after he dies from a heart attack.
unknown date – Powell's Books opens its first bookstore in Portland, Oregon.

New books

Fiction
Kingsley Amis – Girl, 20
Hiroshi Aramata (荒俣 宏) – Teito Monogatari (Tale of the Capitol)
Kofi Awoonor – This Earth, My Brother
Denys Val Baker – The Face in the Mirror
Nanni Balestrini – Vogliamo tutto (We Want Everything)
John Bingham – Vulture in the Sun
William Peter Blatty – The Exorcist
Richard Brautigan – Revenge of the Lawn
Charles Bukowski – Post Office
Albert Camus (died 1960) – A Happy Death (La Mort heureuse)
Victor Canning – Firecrest
John Dickson Carr – Deadly Hall
Agatha Christie
Nemesis
The Golden Ball and Other Stories
Brian Cleeve – Cry of Morning
Miloš Crnjanski – Roman o Londonu (A Novel about London)
Gwen Davis – Touching
L. Sprague de Camp – The Clocks of Iraz
L. Sprague de Camp and Lin Carter – Conan the Buccaneer
Walter de la Mare – Eight Tales
August Derleth, editor – Dark Things
E. L. Doctorow – The Book of Daniel
Hubert Fichte – Detlevs Imitationen »Grünspan« (Detlev's imitations, "verdigris")
E. M. Forster (died 1970) – Maurice (originally completed 1914)
Frederick Forsyth – The Day of the Jackal
Dick Francis – Bonecrack
 Sarah Gainham – Private Worlds
Ernest J. Gaines – The Autobiography of Miss Jane Pittman
George Garrett – Death of the Fox
John Gardner – Grendel
William Golding – The Scorpion God
Richard Gordon – The Medical Witness
Arthur Hailey – Wheels
L.P. Hartley – The Harness Room
Bohumil Hrabal – I Served the King of England (Obsluhoval jsem anglického krále)
David Ireland – The Unknown Industrial Prisoner
Ismail Kadare – Chronicle in Stone (Kronikë në gur)
Anna Kavan – A Scarcity of Love
Thomas Keneally – The Chant of Jimmie Blacksmith
Jerzy Kosinski – Being There
Jacques Laurent – Les Bêtises
John le Carré – The Naive and Sentimental Lover
Ursula K. Le Guin – The Lathe of Heaven
Stanisław Lem
The Star Diaries (Dzienniki gwiazdowe)
The Futurological Congress (Kongres futurologiczny)
Brian Lumley – The Caller of the Black
John D. MacDonald – A Tan and Sandy Silence
Antonine Maillet – La Sagouine
Ruth Manning-Sanders – A Choice of Magic
James A. Michener – The Drifters
Gladys Mitchell – Lament for Leto
Nicholas Mosley – Natalie Natalia
Alice Munro – Lives of Girls and Women
Iris Murdoch – An Accidental Man
V. S. Naipaul – In a Free State
William F. Nolan – Space for Hire
Flannery O'Connor (died 1964) – The Complete Stories (collection)
Walker Percy – Love in the Ruins
Rosamunde Pilcher – The End of Summer
Anthony Powell – Books Do Furnish a Room
Terry Pratchett – The Carpet People
Otfried Preußler – Krabat
Joao Ubaldo Ribeiro – Sergeant Getulio
Mordecai Richler – St. Urbain's Horseman
Harold Robbins – The Betsy
Leonardo Sciascia – Il contesto
Paul Scott – The Towers of Silence (third part of The Raj Quartet)
Hubert Selby Jr. – The Room
Cynthia Propper Seton – The Sea Change of Angela Lewes
Tom Sharpe – Riotous Assembly
Alexander Solzhenitsyn – August 1914
Wallace Stegner – Angle of Repose
Irving Stone – The Passions of the Mind
Francis Stuart – Black List, Section H
Gay Talese – Honor Thy Father
Tom Tryon – The Other
Fred Uhlman – Reunion
John Updike – Rabbit Redux
Joseph Wambaugh – The New Centurions
Herman Wouk – The Winds of War
Roger Zelazny
The Doors of His Face, The Lamps of His Mouth, and Other Stories
Jack of Shadows

Children and young people
Gillian Avery – A Likely Lad
Jack Bickham – The Apple Dumpling Gang
Virginia Hamilton – The Planet of Junior Brown
Roger Hargreaves – Mr. Men (first six of a series of 49 books)
Judith Kerr – When Hitler Stole Pink Rabbit (first of the Out of the Hitler Time trilogy)
Bill Peet
The Caboose Who Got Loose
How Droofus the Dragon Lost His Head
Otfried Preußler – Krabat (The Satanic Mill)
Dr. Seuss – The Lorax
Marjorie W. Sharmat – Getting Something on Maggie Marmelstein

Drama
Simon Gray – Butley
Peter Handke – Der Ritt über den Bodensee (The Ride across Lake Constance)
Franz Xaver Kroetz
Hartnäckig (Persistent)
Heimarbeit (Housework)
Michis Blut: ein Requiem auf bairisch (Michi's Blood: a Requiem in Bavarian)
Stallerhof
Wildwechsel
Mustapha Matura – As Time Goes By
John Mortimer – A Voyage Round My Father (stage version)
Martin Walser – Ein Kinderspiel

Poetry

Maya Angelou – Just Give Me a Cool Drink of Water 'fore I Diiie
Kofi Awoonor – Night of My Blood
Donald S. Fryer – Songs and Sonnets Atlantean
Alan Llwyd – Y March Hud (The Magic Horse)
Clark Ashton Smith – Selected Poems

Non-fiction
G. E. M. Anscombe – Causality and Determination
Pierre Berton – The Last Spike
Carlos Castaneda – A Separate Reality: Further Conversations with Don Juan
Dharampal – Indian Science and Technology in the Eighteenth Century: Some Contemporary European Accounts
Robert Coles
Migrants, Sharecroppers, Mountaineers, vol. 2 of Children of Crisis
The South Goes North, vol 3. of Children of Crisis
Carl N. Degler – Neither Black nor White
Brian J. Ford – Nonscience
Robert Foster – The Complete Guide to Middle-earth
Eduardo Galeano – Open Veins of Latin America (Las venas abiertas de América Latina)
Joan Garrity – The Sensuous Woman
Graham Greene – A Sort of Life
Xaviera Hollander – The Happy Hooker: My Own Story
H. P. Lovecraft – Selected Letters III (1929–1931)
Roger Manvell and Heinrich Fraenkel – Hess: A Biography
Spike Milligan – Adolf Hitler: My Part in His Downfall
Alison Plowden – Young Elizabeth
John Rawls – A Theory of Justice
B. F. Skinner – Beyond Freedom and Dignity
Keith Thomas – Religion and the Decline of Magic: Studies in Popular Beliefs in 16th and 17th-century England
Pierre Vallières – White Niggers of America (translation)
Esther Vilar – The Manipulated Man

Births
January 6 – Karin Slaughter, American crime novelist
January 16 – Helen Darville, Australian novelist
January 18 – Binyavanga Wainaina, Kenyan writer (died 2019)
January 25 – Philip Coppens, Belgian journalist and author (died 2012)
February 3 – Sarah Kane, English playwright (died 1999)
March 13 – Viet Thanh Nguyen, Vietnamese fiction writer
March 29 – José Luis Rodríguez Pittí, Panamanian writer and photographer
May 9 – Dan Chiasson, American poet, critic and journalist
May 25 - Nicole Luiken, Canadian science fiction writer
June 4 – Karl Martin Sinijärv, Estonian journalist and poet
June 28 – Sophie Hannah, English poet and novelist
July 17 – Cory Doctorow, Canadian science fiction writer
July 22 – Akhil Sharma, Indian novelist
July 23 – Mohsin Hamid, Pakistani fiction writer
September 3 – Kiran Desai, Indian novelist
October 17 - Patrick Ness, British-American speculative fiction author
October 25 – Elif Shafak (Elif Şafak), French-born Turkish novelist 
November 5 – Rana Dasgupta, English-born Indian novelist
December 19 – Tristan Egolf, American novelist and activist (died 2005)
unknown dates
Petina Gappah, Zambian-born fiction writer
John Wray, American novelist

Deaths
January 18 – N. Porsenna, Romanian novelist, essayist, poet and social psychologist (Parkinson's disease, born 1892)
January 24 – St. John Greer Ervine, Irish-born dramatist (born 1883)
March 5 – Allan Nevins, American journalist and historian (born 1890)
March 7 – Stevie Smith (Florence Margaret Smith), English poet and novelist (born 1902)
March 21 – Kyūya Fukada (深田 久弥), Japanese writer and mountaineer (born 1903)
March 23 – Simon Vestdijk, Dutch writer (born 1898)
April 10 – André Billy, French novelist (born 1882)
April 13 – Juhan Smuul, Estonian writer (born 1922)
April 15 – Friedebert Tuglas, Estonian writer and critic (born 1886)
May 19 – Ogden Nash, American poet and humorist (born 1902)
May 20 – Waldo Williams, Welsh-language poet (born 1904)
June 1 – Reinhold Niebuhr, American theologian (born 1892)
June 4 – György Lukács (György Bernát Löwinger), Hungarian philosopher and critic (born 1885)
June 5 – Clifford Dyment, English poet (born 1914)
June 6 – Edward Andrade, English writer, poet and physicist (born 1887)
July 4
Maurice Bowra, English poet, humorist and Oxford don (born 1898)
August Derleth, American writer and anthologist (heart attack, born 1909)
July 7 – Claude Gauvreau, Québécois Canadian poet and dramatist (born 1925)
July 27 – Jacques Lusseyran, French author and Resistance fighter (car crash, born 1924)
August 30 – Peter Fleming, English travel writer and traveller (born 1907)
October 13 – János Kemény, American-born Hungarian writer and editor (born 1903)
October 21 – Naoya Shiga, Japanese novelist (pneumonia, born 1883)
October 25 – Philip Wylie, American novelist and non-fiction writer (born 1902)
November – Lucia Mantu, Romanian writer (born 1888)
November 1 – Gertrud von Le Fort, German novelist, poet and essayist (born 1876)
November 10 – Walter Van Tilburg Clark, American novelist (cancer, born 1909)
November 11 – A. P. Herbert, English humorist, novelist and politician (born 1890)
November 28 – Dimitrie Stelaru (Dumitru Petrescu), Romanian poet and novelist (cirrhosis, born 1917)
November 29 – Edith Tolkien (née Bratt), English wife of J. R. R. Tolkien (born 1889)
December 5 – Gaito Gazdanov, Russian-born novelist (born 1903)
December 22 – Godfried Bomans, Dutch writer and broadcaster (heart attack, born 1913)
December 25 – S. Foster Damon, American critic and poet (born 1893)

Awards
Nobel Prize for Literature: Pablo Neruda

Canada
See 1971 Governor General's Awards for complete list.

France
Prix Goncourt: Jacques Laurent, Les Bêtises
Prix Médicis: Pascal Lainé, L'Irrévolution

United Kingdom
Booker Prize: V. S. Naipaul, In a Free State
Carnegie Medal for children's literature: Ivan Southall, Josh
Cholmondeley Award: Charles Causley, Gavin Ewart, Hugo Williams
Eric Gregory Award: Martin Booth, Florence Bull, John Pook, D. M. Warman, John Welch
James Tait Black Memorial Prize for fiction: Nadine Gordimer, A Guest of Honour
James Tait Black Memorial Prize for biography: Julia Namier, Lewis Namier
Queen's Gold Medal for Poetry: Stephen Spender

United States
Frost Medal: Melville Cane
Hugo Award: Larry Niven, Ringworld
Nebula Award: Robert Silverberg, A Time of Changes
Newbery Medal for children's literature: Betsy Byars, Summer of the Swans
Pulitzer Prize for Drama: Paul Zindel, The Effect of Gamma Rays on Man-in-the-Moon Marigolds
Pulitzer Prize for Fiction: no award given
Pulitzer Prize for Poetry: William S. Merwin, The Carrier of Ladders

Elsewhere
Akutagawa Prize: Azuma Mineo, Okinawan Boy
Miles Franklin Award: David Ireland, The Unknown Industrial Prisoner
Alfaguara Prize: Luis Berenguer, Leña verde
Premio Nadal: José María Requena, El cuajarón
Viareggio Prize: Ugo Attardi, L'erede selvaggio

Notes

References

 
Years of the 20th century in literature